Javier Alexis Mojica (born August 31, 1984) is a Puerto Rican basketball player who plays for Vaqueros de Bayamón of the Baloncesto Superior Nacional (BSN). He played college basketball for Central Connecticut.

High school career
Mojica attended the Auburn High School in Auburn, Massachusetts, He played two seasons at Auburn High and one season at Doherty Memorial High School in Worcester, Massachusetts before transferring back to Auburn for his senior season.

College career
Mojica was a walk on to begin his career for the Blue Devils. the Mojica played college basketball for Central Connecticut Blue Devils men's basketball, In his freshman season, he averaged 7.9 points, 2.9 rebounds and 1.3 assists. In his sophomore year, he averaged 9.9 points, 4.5 rebounds and 2.5 assists. In his Junior year, he averaged 8.9 points, 4.6 rebounds and 1.8 assists. In his Senior year, he averaged 16.8 points, 7.9 rebounds and 3.2 assists.

Professional career
Mojica started his professional career at Poland with the AZS Koszalin basketball team in the 2008–09 season. He averaged 16.6 points, 4 rebounds and 1.6 assists while he was there. In the 2008–09 season, Mojica moved to the Puerto-Rican side Vaqueros de Bayamón, in his first season there, He averaged 12.4 points, 4.5 rebounds and 2.4 assists. In his second season at Vaqueros de Bayamón, he averaged 12.4 points, 5.9 rebounds and 3.4 assists. in the 2009–10 season, he moved to the Belgian side B.C. Oostende, where he averaged 6.4 points, 2.9 rebounds and 1.8 assists having played 10 games for the team. He moved back to Vaqueros de Bayamón at the 2010–11 season, in that season he averaged 12.5 points, 5.4 rebounds and 2.3 assists. In the next season at Vaqueros de Bayamón, he averaged 12.2 points, 3.8 rebounds and 2.1 assists. In the same 2011–12 season, he moved to Estudiantes de Bahía Blanca in Argentina, where he averaged 15.6 points, 5.6 rebounds and 1.4 assists. In the 2012–13 season, he played for Quimsa in Argentina where he averaged 10 points, 2.5 rebounds and 0.8 assists. In the 2012–13 season, he also played for Vaqueros de Bayamón, where he averaged 14.4 points, 5.6 rebounds and 3.1 assists. In the 2013–14 season, he played for the Puerto-Rican side Cangrejeros de Santurce, where he averaged 9.8 points, 2.2 rebounds and 0.9 assists. In the 2014–15 season at Cangrejeros de Santurce, he averaged 12.5 points, 2.3 rebounds and 1.2 assists in that season. In the 2015–16 season, he continued playing at Cangrejeros de Santurce, he averaged 10.5 points, 2.7 rebounds and 1 assists in that season. In the 2016–17 season, he moved to the Puerto-rican side Piratas de Quebradillas, where he averaged 8.2 points, 2.6 rebounds and 2.5 assists. He moved back to Vaqueros de Bayamón in the 2017–18 season, in that season, where he averaged 13.8 points, 4.9 rebounds and 3.0 assists. In the 2018–19 season at Vaqueros de Bayamón, Mojica averaged 18.8 points, 3.6 rebounds and 3.4 assists.

International career
Mojica represented the Puerto Rican Basketball National team at the 2008 FIBA World Olympic Qualifying Tournament for Men in Athens Greece, where he averaged 3 points, 3.6 rebounds and 0.2 assists during the tournament. Javier Mojica also represented the Puerto Rican Basketball National team at the 2019 FIBA Basketball World Cup where he averaged 2 points and 1.8 rebounds and 0.2 assists.

References

External links
 RealGM profile

1984 births
Living people
AZS Koszalin players
Basketball players from Massachusetts
Cangrejeros de Santurce basketball players
Central Connecticut Blue Devils men's basketball players
Estudiantes de Bahía Blanca basketball players
Fuerza Regia de Monterrey players
Jefes de Fuerza Lagunera players
Leñadores de Durango players
Panteras de Aguascalientes players
People from Auburn, Massachusetts
Piratas de Quebradillas players
Point guards
Real Estelí Baloncesto players
Puerto Rican expatriate basketball people in Nicaragua
Puerto Rican men's basketball players
Quimsa basketball players
2019 FIBA Basketball World Cup players
Sportspeople from Worcester County, Massachusetts
Doherty Memorial High School alumni
American expatriate basketball people in Nicaragua
American expatriate basketball people in Belgium
American expatriate basketball people in Poland
American expatriate basketball people in Argentina
American expatriate basketball people in Mexico
Puerto Rican expatriate basketball people in Mexico
Puerto Rican expatriate basketball people in Argentina
Puerto Rican expatriate basketball people in Poland
American men's basketball players
American sportspeople of Puerto Rican descent